Makhmutovo (Mäxmüt) is a rural locality (a village) in Khalilovsky Selsoviet, Abzelilovsky District, Bashkortostan, Russia. The population was 584 as of 2010. There are 7 streets.

Geography 
Makhmutovo is located 30 km south of Askarovo (the district's administrative centre) by road. Abdulmambetovo is the nearest rural locality.

References 

Rural localities in Abzelilovsky District